S830 may refer to :
 Canon S830D, a Canon S Series digital camera
 Olympus S830, a microcassette voice recorder